Pavlo Arhypovych Zahrebelnyi or Zagrebelnyi (25 August 1924 – 3 February 2009) was a Soviet and Ukrainian novelist.

Biography
He graduated from secondary school in 1941. That same year, when Germany invaded the Soviet Union, he enlisted the Red Army, participated in the Battle of Kiev, and was severely wounded. After recovering, he was returned to service again and received another serious wound in August 1942. On that occasion, he was captured and was in a Nazi prisoner-of-war camp until February 1945.

Upon his release, he worked for the Soviet military mission in West Germany, then served as a journalist at a collective farm. In 1951, he began studying philology at Dnepropetrovsk State University. This was followed by several editorial positions; notably as deputy editor-in-chief for the journal . He was the editor-in-chief of Literaturna Ukrayina from 1961 to 1963. It was during this time that he started writing novels. 

From 1973 to 1986, he held several positions at the National Writers' Union of Ukraine, eventually becoming First Secretary, despite efforts by the poet Boris Oliynyk to deny him that position. He was awarded the Shevchenko National Prize in 1974 and the USSR State Prize in 1980. He also received the Hero of Ukraine award for his works on 25 August 2004.

One of his best known novels is Roksolana (1980), about the life of Anastasia Lisovska, a Ruthenian girl from Galicia who became a wife of Sultan Suleiman the Magnificent and played a prominent role in the sixteenth century Ottoman Empire.

On 5 February 2009, President Viktor Yushchenko paid his last respects to Zahrebelnyi.

In December 2022 the Nikolay Raevsky street in Kyiv was renamed to Pavlo Zahrebelnyi street.

Zahrebelny's books have been translated into 23 languages.

Bibliography
Zahrebelny's works include novels and stories like:

 "Thinking About Eternity" (1957)
 "Europe-45" (1958)
 "Heat" (1960)
 "Europe West" (1961)
 "A Day For a Future" (1964)
 "Whisper" (1966)
 "Kind Devil" (1967)
 "Wonder" (1968)
 "From the Point of Eternity" (1970)
 "Let's Come to Love" (1971)
 "First Bridge" (1972)
 "Death in Kyiv" (1973)
 "Lathered Grass" (1974)
 "Eupraksia" (1975)
 "Lion's Heart" (1978)
 "Acceleration" (1978)
 "Clarinets of Tenderness" (1978)
 "Roksolana" (1980)
 "I am Bohdan" (1983)
 "Southern Comfort" (1984)
 "Expulsion from Eden" (1985)
 "The Sixth Day" (1985)
 "Traceless Lucas" (1989)
 "Naked Soul" (1992)
 "Angel Flesh" (1993)
 "Thousand-Year-Old Nikolai" (1994)
 "Ashes of Dreams" (1995)
 "The Long Dreams Valley" (1995)
 "Heat Haze" (1995)
 "Special Security Zone" (1999)
 "Julia" (2000)

References

External links 

 Encyclopedia of Soviet Writers

1924 births
2009 deaths
20th-century Swiss novelists
20th-century Ukrainian politicians
20th-century Ukrainian writers
21st-century deaths from tuberculosis
People from Poltava Oblast
People from Poltava Governorate
Communist Party of the Soviet Union members
Ninth convocation members of the Verkhovna Rada of the Ukrainian Soviet Socialist Republic
Tenth convocation members of the Supreme Soviet of the Soviet Union
Eleventh convocation members of the Soviet of the Union
Oles Honchar Dnipro National University alumni
Second Kiev Artillery College alumni
Recipients of the Honorary Diploma of the Cabinet of Ministers of Ukraine
Recipients of the Order of Bohdan Khmelnytsky, 3rd class
Recipients of the Order of Friendship of Peoples
Recipients of the Order of Prince Yaroslav the Wise, 5th class
Recipients of the Order of the Red Banner of Labour
Recipients of the Shevchenko National Prize
Recipients of the title of Hero of Ukraine
Recipients of the USSR State Prize
Historical novelists
Nazi concentration camp survivors
Socialist realism writers
Ukrainian male short story writers
Ukrainian novelists
Soviet military personnel of World War II
Soviet prisoners of war
Tuberculosis deaths in Ukraine
Burials at Baikove Cemetery